Colonus may refer to:

 Colonus (person), a tenant farmer from the late Roman Empire and Early Middle Ages
 Colonus (spider), a genus of jumping spiders
 Kolonos, a modern neighborhood in Athens
 Colonus (Attica) (also Hippeios Colonus, Colonus Hippius, Hippius Colonus), an ancient-Greece deme near Athens
 Agoraios Kolonos, a hill near the Temple of Hephaestus
 Kolonos Hill, a hill in Central Greece